The 2018 presidential campaign of Ciro Gomes was announced on 8 March 2018. At the Democratic Labour Party (PDT) convention on 20 July, Gomes was formally nominated as the party's presidential candidate. His running mate, Kátia Abreu, former Minister of Agriculture in Dilma Rousseff's government, was confirmed as his running mate on 5 August, on the last day of political parties conventions. Ciro Gomes' party formed the coalition Sovereign Brazil with AVANTE.

Ciro had previously been a candidate for the presidency in 1998 and 2002 as the candidate of the Popular Socialist Party (PPS), losing both times. Seen as a prospective frontrunner in 2010, Ciro ended up forgoing a bid. 

Gomes finished third in the first round, receiving around 12.47% of the vote. He signaled his opposition to then-frontrunner Jair Bolsonaro for the run-off, although he did not formally endorse Bolsonaro's opponent Fernando Haddad.

Presidential ticket
For the position of Vice President, Ciro chose former Minister of Agriculture and Senator from Tocantins Kátia Abreu as his running mate. Abreu was previously a member of the centrist Brazilian Democratic Movement party, but was expelled due to her opposition to the impeachment of Dilma Rousseff, thus leading to her joining the PDT. Despite her opposition to Dilma's impeachment, many on the left criticized the choice of Abreu for Vice President due to her history as an ally of agribusiness interests.

Campaign platform 
In the realm of economic policy, Ciro ran in support of a financial transaction tax on large-scale financial transactions and increased state funding for education and healthcare services. On social policy, Ciro ran in support of creating a national secretariat specifically to protect LGBT rights in Brazil.

Election result

Presidential elections

Post-election analysis 
Following Haddad's loss to Bolsonaro, some on the political left indicated that they wished that Ciro faced Bolsonaro in the second round instead of Haddad. This is because Haddad's loss was largely attributed to anti-PT sentiment following Operation Car Wash, which would not have affected Ciro. Governor Rui Costa of Bahia, a PT member, stated that the PT should have supported Ciro instead of Haddad for this reason. 

Alexandre Frota, a conservative politician formerly affiliated with Bolsonaro's PSL, apologized in 2019 for past verbal assaults on Ciro, stating that in retrospect Ciro was correct about his criticisms of Bolsonaro. Ciro would later accept his apology.

Party representation
 Democratic Labour Party
 Avante

Endorsements
 Singer-songwriter Caetano Veloso
 Actress and ex-wife Patricia Pillar
 Singer Alcione Nazareth
 Actor Chay Suede
 Musician Tico Santa Cruz
 Musician Wesley Safadão
 Actor Marcos Veras
 Actress Mika Lins
Governor of Ceará Camilo Santana, a member of the Workers' Party (PT)
 YouTuber PC Siqueira
Actor Caco Ciocler
Blogger, television presenter, and actress Titi Müller
Actor Nicolas Prattes
Actor Vladimir Brichta
Actress Mariana Xavier
Olympic swimmer Joanna Maranhão
Actor, comedian and poet Gregório Duvivier

See also
 2018 Brazilian general election
 2002 Brazilian general election
 1994 Brazilian general election

References

External links
Official campaign website
2018 Brazilian general election
2018 Brazilian presidential campaigns